St. Andrew's House (SAH), on the southern flank of Calton Hill in central Edinburgh, is the headquarters building of the Scottish Government. The building stands on the site of the former Calton Gaol. Today, the turreted Governor's House is all that remains of the former prison, next to the Old Calton Burial Ground and Political Martyrs' Monument.

The large Category A listed Art Deco-influenced building looks out over Waverley Station, the Canongate and Holyrood Park.

Construction

The building was designed by Thomas S. Tait of Burnet, Tait and Lorne, architects, who won the architectural competition to gain the commission. Construction began in November 1935 and was completed in 1939; the building initially housed the Scottish Office, including the offices of the Secretary of State for Scotland. The heraldic sculpture on the front is by John Marshall.

The requirement for the building arose as a result of a post First World War policy of limited transfer of devolved administrative (but not legislative) power to Scotland from London. The building opened to staff on Monday 4 September 1939 (the day after War was declared).  An official Royal opening ceremony timed to take place on 12 October 1939 was "cancelled due to War" (Britain's first air raid of the war took place only four days later over the Forth Bridge). Instead, it was officially opened by King George VI and Queen Elizabeth on 26 February 1940.

Architecture

Architecturally, the building is monolithic, symmetrical and restrained on the main north facade. To the south, facing the Waverley valley, it is much more irregular and romantic in expression. There are many Art Deco influences.

Tait's design incorporates elements of Art Deco and Streamline Moderne and is noted for being a rare example of sensitively designed modern architecture in Edinburgh.

The building features a number of sculpted decorations, also in the Art Deco style, which are credited to several sculptors: Sir William Reid Dick designed symbolic figures; heraldic devices are the work of Alexander Carrick and Phyllis Bone; the large bronze doors were designed by Walter Gilbert and executed by H.H. Martyn; and the secondary doors and stairs are by Thomas Hadden.

St Andrew's House is designated a Category A listed building by Historic Scotland.

Governmental use

St. Andrew's House was originally designed and built as the official headquarters of the Scottish Office. Following the passing of the Scotland Act 1998, since 1999 St. Andrew's House now accommodates part of the Scottish Government, including the office of the First Minister of Scotland and Deputy First Minister of Scotland along with the Private Offices of all the Cabinet Secretaries and the Directorates dealing with justice and health. The building underwent a major refurbishment in 2001, although the facade is still coated in a sooty residue. It now accommodates 1,400 civil servants and has eight floors.

References

External links

 St. Andrew's House on the Gazetteer for Scotland
 Scottish Government site celebrating the 70th anniversary of the building

Buildings and structures completed in 1939
Art Deco architecture in Scotland
Category A listed buildings in Edinburgh
Government buildings in Edinburgh
Listed government buildings in Scotland
Politics of Edinburgh
Government buildings in Scotland
1939 establishments in Scotland
Calton Hill